James Allen Inglis (1872 – after 1899) was a Scottish professional footballer who played as an outside right. He moved from Airdrieonians to Small Heath for a fee of £40, and in his first season, 1896–97, scored 16 League goals which made him the club's leading scorer. After another two seasons disrupted by injury and loss of form he moved to Luton Town.

References

1872 births
Year of death missing
Scottish footballers
Association football wingers
Airdrieonians F.C. (1878) players
Birmingham City F.C. players
Luton Town F.C. players
English Football League players
Place of death missing
Date of birth missing